Udarnik is a rural locality (a selo) in Chulokskoye Rural Settlement, Buturlinovsky District, Voronezh Oblast, Russia. The population was 490 as of 2010. There are 10 streets.

Geography 
Udarnik is located 19 km northeast of Buturlinovka (the district's administrative centre) by road. Chulok is the nearest rural locality.

References 

Rural localities in Buturlinovsky District